was a Japanese politician of the Liberal Democratic Party, a member of the House of Representatives in the Diet (national legislature). A native of Aichi Prefecture and graduate of Nagoya University, he was elected to the first of his three terms in Aichi Prefectural Assembly in 1987 and then to the House of Representatives for the first time in 2000. He was defeated in the 2009 election by Kazuyoshi Morimoto of the Democratic Party of Japan.

References

External links
 Official website in Japanese.

Living people
1947 births
Liberal Democratic Party (Japan) politicians
Members of the House of Representatives (Japan)
Members of the Aichi Prefectural Assembly
Nagoya University alumni
21st-century Japanese politicians